Isayev may refer to:

Isayev (surname)
Isaev (crater), a lunar crater
Isayev S-125, a Soviet surface-to-air missile system
Isayev, name of several rural localities in Russia